Black Beauty is an album by the psychedelic rock band Love, released on February 13, 2012. Issued on High Moon Records, it compiles material from a canceled studio album, which frontman Arthur Lee—backed by a new group with an all-black line-up—planned to have released on the Buffalo Records label. Recorded after a series of unsuccessful albums, both with Love and his 1972 solo effort Vindicator, Black Beauty was intended to serve as Lee's comeback album. Among other Love releases, it is notable for its reinvention of the band as a funk group, while preserving Lee's lyrical complexity.

Released nearly six years after the death of Lee, Black Beauty did not represent the pinnacle of Lee's musical creativity, but is seen as an appropriate closing chapter on his and Love's recording career. Some of the tracks for the canceled album had appeared beforehand on compilation albums such as Reel to Real and Love Lost; however, Black Beauty is the first release to assemble all the compositions from the 1973 recording sessions. While the album does not represent the classic Love line-up, music critics have recognized it as the best representation of Lee's hard rock period.

Background

In July 1968, eight months after Love's third album Forever Changes, frontman Arthur Lee disbanded the original line-up, before regrouping with a completely new troupe of musicians. Recording three additional albums with Love, Lee found limited success and was on the verge of obscurity. Influenced by his recording sessions with Jimi Hendrix in April 1970, after concluding a European tour in England, Lee forsook his folk rock roots in favor of a hard rock approach. In 1972, he released his first solo effort Vindicator, the first Lee album composed in the newly adapted style, but, again, it did not fare well with music critics and buyers. Despite Lee's self-doubt and unwillingness to tour, he decided to persevere with another line-up; while Love had always been a racially integrated group, Lee told drummer Joe Blocker, "I want an all-black band. I want some cats that can play funky and rock". To fulfill his aspirations, Lee recruited Blocker, Melvan Whittington (lead guitar), and Robert Rozelle (bass guitar).

With record producer Paul Rothchild, best known for his work with the Doors, at the helm, Love recorded throughout mid-1973. Writing for the Allmusic website, Mark Deming described the group's sound, saying the material generally had a "stronger R&B undertow along with Hendrix-influenced songs and guitar work ('Midnight Sun' sounds like something Jimi could have written, and Whittington's soloing captures the mood of Hendrix's playing without lifting his licks)". Deming also accounts for "some moodier numbers like 'Skid' and 'See Myself in You'". On tracks "Can't Find It" and "Walk Right In", however, the band is reminiscent of the hushed ballads arranged in Forever Changes.

Intended to be released on Buffalo Records, a small indie label founded by Hair producer Michael Butler, the company went bankrupt before Black Beauty could be distributed. Songs from the recording sessions did however appear on Reel to Real in 1974. In 2009, Sundazed Records released Love Lost, an album with two songs that later were featured on Black Beauty, including "Midnight Sun" and "Can't Find It". As years progressed, poor-quality releases of the Black Beauty sessions arose, motivating Lee to push for an official release up until his death in 2006.

Release and reception

Overseen by Lee's widow Diana and record producer George Baer Wallace, High Moon Records remastered recovered original acetates of the Black Beauty sessions, and released it on a limited 5,000-vinyl pressing on February 13, 2012 (catalogue number HMRLP-01). Among the packaging for the album, there is an extensive 28-page booklet written by rock critic Ben Edmonds, each copy of the album is individually numbered, and the cover features a portrait of Lee designed by Herbert Worthington, cover photographer of Fleetwood Mac’s Rumours. In 2014, High Moon reissued Black Beauty on CD format. An accompanying and expanded 62-page booklet contains discussions with former band members, and rare photos which documented the 1973 recording sessions. In addition, there are six bonus tracks: the title-song to the obscure film of the same name, "Thomasine & Bushrod", a 22-minute interview with Lee in 1974, three live performances from 1974, and Arthur Lee and Ventilator's tune, "L. A. Blues".

Stephen M. Deusner of Pitchfork magazine wrote the Love line-up "sounds perfectly rough and unrehearsed, generating a tense energy", while also noting that "Lee sounds engaged and invigorated, forgoing the bitterness that had rankled the band for a slightly more hopeful outlook". In a four-star review for Record Collector, Jason Draper considered that Black Beauty "picked up on Hendrix's late-period R&B", and had praise for the 1974 interview which produces the "fullest picture we’ll ever have of this once-lost chapter in Lee’s red book". In an article for Rolling Stone magazine, critic David Fricke wrote: "Black Beauty might have been received as a strong comeback for Lee, a turn to steamy R&B with heavy-guitar punch — if it had come out".

From the online magazine PopMatters rock critic Michael Fiander comments that the album "may have a totally different sonic palate than Forever Changes or Da Capo", but is uniquely similar with "Lee’s emotionally revealing lyrics and careful pop sensibilities". Reviewing the deluxe reissue of the album, Rob Ross proclaimed Black Beauty "the great lost Love album", praising the cohesive effort of the group, and the quality production, "considering the only source originally known was from acetates". Writing for Uncut magazine, Luke Thorn recounted the album's troubled beginning before stating "Black Beauty was intended to be a culmination, the crowning achievement of Lee’s new direction".

Track listing
All songs were written by Arthur Lee except where noted.

Side one
"Young and Able (Good and Evil)" - 3:24
"Midnight Sun" - 3:33
"Can't Find It" - 3:46
"Walk Right In" (Gus Cannon); with "Always See Your Face" interlude (Arthur Lee) - 3:23
"Skid" (Angela Rackley, Riley Racer) - 2:52

Side two
"Beep Beep" - 2:14
"Stay Away" - 2:47
"Lonely Pigs" - 4:25
"See Myself in You" - 3:03
"Product of the Times" - 4:11

Bonus tracks
"Thomasine & Bushrod" [Title song from the motion picture] - 2:26
Arthur Lee Interview - 22:16
"Every Time I Look Up, I'm Down" [Live] - 3:32
"Nothing" [Live] - 3:06
"Keep on Shining" [Live] - 5:56
"L.A. Blues" - 3:02

Personnel
 Arthur Lee - guitar, keyboards, vocals
 Melvan Whittington - guitar, keyboards (tracks 1-9)
 Robert Rozelle - bass (tracks 1-9)
 Joe Blocker - drums, vocals (tracks 1-9)
 Craig Tarwater - guitar (track 10)
 Frank Fayad - bass (track 10)
 Don Poncher - drums (track 10)

References

2012 albums
Love (band) albums
Albums produced by Arthur Lee (musician)
Albums produced by Paul A. Rothchild